The 2010–11 season will be Kaposvári Rákóczi FC's 12th competitive season, 7th consecutive season in the Soproni Liga and 87th year in existence as a football club.

Team kit and logo
The team kits for the 2010–11 season are produced by Givova. The home kit is white colour and the away kit is green and white colours.

Transfers

Summer

In:

Out:

List of Hungarian football transfer summer 2010

Club

Coaching staff

Top scorers
Includes all competitive matches. The list is sorted by shirt number when total goals are equal.

Last updated on 27 November 2010

Disciplinary record
Includes all competitive matches. Players with 1 card or more included only.

Last updated on 27 November 2010

Overall
{|class="wikitable"
|-
|Games played || 21 (16 Soproni Liga, 2 Magyar Kupa and 3 Ligakupa)
|-
|Games won || 11 (9 Soproni Liga, 2 Magyar Kupa and 0 Ligakupa)
|-
|Games drawn ||  4 (2 Soproni Liga, 0 Magyar Kupa and 2 Ligakupa)
|-
|Games lost ||  6 (5 Soproni Liga, 0 Magyar Kupa and 1 Ligakupa)
|-
|Goals scored || 33
|-
|Goals conceded || 27
|-
|Goal difference || +6
|-
|Yellow cards || 51
|-
|Red cards || 3
|-
|rowspan="1"|Worst discipline ||  Kornél Kulcsár (7 , 0 )
|-
|rowspan="2"|Best result || 5–3 (A) v Zalaegerszegi TE – Nemzeti Bajnokság I – 31-07-2010
|-
| 2–0 (A) v MTK Budapest FC – Nemzeti Bajnokság I – 09-10-2010
|-
|rowspan="2"|Worst result || 1–4 (H) v Videoton FC Fehérvár – Nemzeti Bajnokság I – 06-11-2010
|-
| 0–3 (H) v BFC Siófok – Ligakupa – 24-11-2010
|-
|rowspan="1"|Most appearances ||  Kornél Kulcsár (21 appearances)
|-
|rowspan="1"|Top scorer ||   Lóránt Oláh (11 goals)
|-
|Points || 37/63 (58.73%)
|-

Nemzeti Bajnokság I

Classification

Results summary

Results by round

Matches

Zalaegerszegi TE: Vlaszák – Kocsárdi, Miljatovic (Szalai 32.), Kovács, Varga – Balázs, Kamber, Máté (Magasföldi 69.), Illés (Horváth A. 39.) – Rudnevs, Pavicevic. Coach: János Csank.
Kaposvári Rákóczi FC: Kovács – Zsók, Grúz, Okuka, Balázs – Gujic, Pavlovic, Kulcsár (Hegedűs 62.), Pedro – Oláh (Zsolnai 65.), Jawad (Godslove 80.). Coach: Tibor Sisa.
G.: Rudnevs (45., 60.), Balázs (66.) – Pavlovic (16., 59.), Kovács (28. – o.g.), Oláh (28.), Grúz (45.)
Y.: Kovács (55.), Máté (64.) – Balázs (54.), Gujic (66.)

Kaposvári Rákóczi FC: Kovács – Okuka, Grúz, Zsók, Gujic – Kulcsár (Szepessy 70.), Balázs (Hegedűs 64.), Pavlovic, Pedro (Zsolnai 80.), Jawad – Oláh. Coach: Tibor Sisa.
Újpest FC: Balajcza – Szokol, Vermes, Takács, Pollák – Simek (Banai 87.), Egerszegi (Böőr 72.), Rajczi, Mitrovic (Rubus 91.), Tajthy – Tisza. Coach: Géza Mészöly.
G.: Grúz (46. – o.g.)
Y.: Kulcsár (25.), Zsók (35.) – Egerszegi (11.), Takács (91.), Banai (93.)
R.: Tisza (70.)

Kaposvári Rákóczi FC: Kovács – Grúz, Okuka, Zsók – Gujic, Pedro, Balázs, Kulcsár (Peric 79.), Jawad (Godslove 90.) – Pavlovic, Szepessy (Zsolnai 57.). Coach: Tibor Sisa.
Szombathelyi Haladás: Rózsa – Schimmer, Lengyel, Guzmics, Tóth – Iszlai (Kovács 69.), Molnár, Á. Simon – G. Nagy, Oross (Rácz 73.), Ugrai. Coach: Aurél Csertői.
G.: Jawad (9.)
Y.: Gujic (22.), Pavlovic (58.), Okuka (80.) – Iszlai (68.), G. Nagy (85.)

BFC Siófok: Molnár – Fehér, Graszl, Mogyorósi, Novák – Kecskés (Lukács 61.), Kocsis, Ludánszki, Thiago (Csermelyi 77.), Délczeg (Roni 61.) – Sowunmi. Coach: István Mihalecz.
Kaposvári Rákóczi FC: Kovács – Okuka, Grúz, Zsók, Gujic – Pedro, Kulcsár (Peric 74.), Balázs, Jawad – Pavlovic (Hegedűs 64.), Szepessy (Oláh 46.). Coach: Tibor Sisa.
G.: —
Y.: Szepessy (19.), Okuka (26.), Oláh (88.), Hegedűs (91.)

Kaposvári Rákóczi FC: Kovács – Okuka, Grúz, Zsók, Gujic – Godslove (Pavlovic 50.), Balázs (Kulcsár 50.), Lipusz, Hegedűs, Oláh – Peric (Szepessy 87.). Coach: Tibor Sisa.
Lombard-Pápa TFC: Szűcs – Quintero (Zulevs 71.), Bíró, Farkas, P. Takács – Németh, Gyömbér, Jovánczai (Rebryk 62.) – Abwo, Bárányos, Maric (Venczel 83.). Coach: György Véber.
G.: Grúz (84.), Kulcsár (87.), Zsók (92.) – Abwo (36.), P. Takács (79.)
Y.: Grúz (50.), Kulcsár (68.) – Bárányos (32.)
R.: P. Takács (83.)

Vasas SC: Végh – Balog (Polényi 75.), Arnaut, Gáspár, Katona (Arsic 80.) – Lázok, Pavicevic, Hrepka (Phantkhava 46.), Bakos, Benounes – Ferenczi. Coach: Giovanni Dellacasa.
Kaposvári Rákóczi FC: Kovács – Okuka, Grúz, Zsók, Gujic – Szepessy (Peric 90.), Pedro (Kulcsár 70.), Hegedűs, Jawad – Oláh, Pavlovic (Balázs 46.). Coach: Tibor Sisa.
G.: Ferenczi (52. – pen.) – Pavlovic (13. – pen.), Jawad (14.), Gujic (68. – pen.)
Y.: Arnaut (10.), Bakos (29.), Gáspár (81.) – Pedro (30.), Hegedűs (41.), Grúz (52.), Jawad (69.)
R.: Ferenczi (55.), Gáspár (86.)

Kaposvári Rákóczi FC: Kovács – Lelkes, Grúz (Zahorecz 67.), Zsók, Gujic – Szepessy (Kulcsár 75.), Pedro, Hegedűs, Balázs (Zsolnai 62.) – Oláh, Jawad. Coach: Tibor Sisa.
Paksi SE: Csernyánszki – Fiola, Éger, Sifter (Szabó 65.), Ceehi – Bartha, Heffler, Sipeki (Böde 46.), Vayer – Montvai, Kiss (Magasföldi 85.). Coach: Károly Kis.
G.: Oláh (25. – pen.) – Böde (61.), Montvai (65.)
Y.: Balázs (35.), Zsók (47.), Lelkes (57.) – Sifter (30.), Éger (62.), Fiola (91.)

MTK Budapest FC: Szatmári – Vukadinovic, Szekeres, Sütő – Pátkai, Ladányi (Eppel 87.), Vukmir (Vadnai 56.), Kanta – Tischler, A. Pál, Könyves. Coach: József Garami.
Kaposvári Rákóczi FC: Kovács – Grúz, Gujic, Zahorecz, Zsók, Okuka – Pavlovic, Pedro, Jawad (Balázs 66.) – Peric (Kulcsár 85.), Oláh (Szepessy 89.). Coach: Tibor Sisa.
G.: Peric (31.), Oláh (70.)
Y.: Ladányi (39.), Pátkai (53.) – Grúz (51.), Okuka (62.)

Kaposvári Rákóczi FC: Kovács – Okuka, Zahorecz, Zsók, Gujic – Hegedűs (Kulcsár 53.), Balázs, Pedro (Grúz 85.), Jawad (Pavlovic 73.) – Oláh, Peric. Coach: Tibor Sisa.
Kecskeméti TE: Rybánsky – Némedi, Gyagya, Balogh, Mohl – Csordás, Cukic, Koncz (Savic 60.), Litsingi (Bori 55.), Foxi – Tököli. Coach: István Szabó.
G.: Jawad (19.), Oláh (37.) – Gyagya (12.)
Y.: Oláh (15.) – Bori (64.), Cukic (71.), Gyagya (87.)

Ferencvárosi TC: Ranilovic – Balog, Csizmadia, Rodenbücher, Adriano – Andrezinho (Józsi 80.), Maróti, Rósa, Stanic (Tóth 71.), Schembri – Miljkovic (Heinz 57.). Coach: László Prukner.
Kaposvári Rákóczi FC: Kovács – Grúz (Balázs 69.), Okuka, Zahorecz, Zsók – Gujic, Pavlovic, Pedro, Jawad (Godslove 81.) – Oláh, Peric (Kulcsár 62.). Coach: Tibor Sisa.
G.: Rósa (44. – pen.)
Y.: Andrezinho (33.), Rodenbücher (52.), Maróti (66.) – Zsók (14.), Okuka (33.), Oláh (36.), Grúz (40.), Zahorecz (78.), Kulcsár (81.)
R.: Maróti (75.) – Zahorecz (89.)

Kaposvári Rákóczi FC: Kovács – Gujic (Kovácsevics 9.), Okuka, Grúz, Zsók – Hegedűs, Kulcsár, Pavlovic, Jawad (Balázs 79.) – Oláh (Szepessy 86.), Peric. Coach: Tibor Sisa.
Budapest Honvéd FC: Kemenes – Takács, Debreceni, Botis, Hajdú – Moreira, Abass (Rufino 90.), Horváth, Coira, Sadjo (Bojtor 85.) – Rouani (Danilo 43.). Coach: Massimo Morales.
G.: —
Y.: Pavlovic (61.) – Coria (40.), Sadjo (83.), Moreira (89.)
R.: Pavlovic (68.)

Debreceni VSC: Malinauskas – Nagy, Mijadinoski, Simac, Fodor – Czvitkovics, Bódi (Dombi 55.), Varga, Szakály – Coulibaly (Szilágyi 66.), Yannick (Kiss 73.). Coach: András Herczeg.
Kaposvári Rákóczi FC: Kovács – Grúz, Okuka, Zsók, Kovácsevics – Kulcsár (Godslove 76.), Pedro, Oláh, Hegedűs, Jawad (Balázs 70.) – Peric. Coach: Tibor Sisa.
G.: Bódi (36.), Czvitkovics (71., 75.) – Oláh (43.)
Y.: Simac (31.) – Kulcsár (38.), Grúz (70.), Pedro (77.)

Kaposvári Rákóczi FC: Milinte – Petrók, Okuka (Godslove 83.), Zsók, Kovácsevics – Pavlovic, Pedro (Kulcsár 57.), Oláh, Hegedűs, Balázs – Peric (Szepessy 78.). Coach: Tibor Sisa.
Videoton FC Fehérvár: Bozovic – Lázár, Lipták, Vaskó, Andic – Sándor (Mutumba 72.), Vasiljevic (Szakály 46.), Farkas, Elek, Polonkai – Alves (Nikolic 61.). Coach: György Mezey.
G.: Oláh (77.) – Alves (2. – pen., 22.), Vasiljevic (12.), Elek (67.)
Y.: Peric (25.)
R.: Zsók (89.)

Szolnoki MÁV FC: Rézsó – Cornaci, Balogh, Pető, Szalai – Ngalle, Molnár, Búrány (Hevesi-Tóth 69.), Antal (Vörös 77.), Remili – Koós (Lengyel 71.). Coach: Antal Simon.
Kaposvári Rákóczi FC: Milinte – Gujic, Grúz, Okuka, Zahorecz – Hegedűs, Kulcsár (Pedro 68.), Szepessy, Balázs, Jawad (Peric 59.) – Oláh (Godslove 88.). Coach: Tibor Sisa.
G.: Ngalle (60.) – Szepessy (2.), Peric (66.)
Y.: Pető (9.), Cornaci (62.) – Okuka (14.), Hegedűs (16.), Zahorecz (86.), Szepessy (90.)

Kaposvári Rákóczi FC: Milinte – Grúz, Zsók, Zahorecz – Gujic, Hegedűs, Balázs, Pedro, Jawad (Pavlovic 86.) – Szepessy (Kulcsár 56.), Oláh (Peric 77.). Coach: Tibor Sisa.
Győri ETO FC: Stevanovic – Copa, Djordjevic, Eugene, Völgyi – Trajkovic (Sharashenidze 60.), Ganugrava (Ji-Paraná 30.), Pilibaitis (Briones 68.), Koltai – Ceolin, Bouguerra. Coach: Attila Pintér.
G.: Oláh (13., 57.), Pedro (59.)
Y.: Pedro (38.) – Ganugrava (12.), Copa (13.), Völgyi (63.), Pilibaitis (67.)

Kaposvári Rákóczi FC: Milinte – Gujic (Jawad 46.), Grúz, Okuka, Zsók – Pavlovic, Balázs, Hegedűs (Szepessy 69.), Pedro – Oláh, Peric (Kulcsár 85.). Coach: Tibor Sisa.
Zalaegerszegi TE: Vlaszák – Kocsárdi (Turcsik 70.), Miljatovic, Varga, Panikvar – Szalai, Horváth (Delic 62.), Kamber, Illés (Bogunovic 83.) – Simon, Rajcomar. Coach: János Csank.
G.: Oláh (11.), Peric (13.) – Simon (1.)
Y.: Hegedűs (16.), Okuka (26.) – Varga (12.), Kamber (21.), Rajcomar (26.)

Hungarian Cup

Third round

Szekszárdi UFC: Horváth – Dienes, Kőkuti (Buzás 88.), Tóth, Calka – Ranga (Benizs 72.), Koch, Deli, Pákai (Letenyei 80.) – Mészáros, Kohány. Coach: Pál Dienes.
Kaposvári Rákóczi FC: Milinte – Kovácsevics, Petrók, Zahorecz, Lelkes – Keresztes (Oláh 55.), O. Kovács, Godslove (Peric 59.), Kulcsár – Lipusz, Zsolnai (Gujic 70.). Coach: Tibor Sisa.
G.: Kohány (38.) – Zsolnai (29.), Peric (68., 79.)
Y.: Tóth (30.), Kőkuti (55.) – Kulcsár (78.)

Fourth round

Dunaharaszti MTK: Szappanos – Rétsági, Ughy, Hajba (Grimm 80.), Riba – Wágner, Kaszai, Szemán, Füzi (Graeser 68., Kovacsik 112.) – Dabasi, Nánási. Coach: Péter Króner.
Kaposvári Rákóczi FC: Milinte – Godslove, Petrók, Zahorecz, Lelkes – O. Kovács (Kulcsár 57.), Balázs Pavlovic, Zsolnai (Oláh 56.) – Lipusz (Peric 69.), Szepessy. Coach: Tibor Sisa.
G.: Szemán (65. – pen.) – Petrók (58.), Oláh (112.)
Y.: Riba (28.), Füzi (45.), Nánási (48.) – O. Kovács (33.), Lelkes (55.), Petrók (64.), Kulcsár (73.), Godslove (92.)
R.: Wágner (11.)

League Cup

Group stage

Kaposvári Rákóczi FC: Kovács – Okuka, Grúz (Petrók 77.), Zsók, Kovácsevics (Gujic 58.) – Pedro, Balázs (Hegedűs 88.), Jawad, Pavlovic (Lipusz 73.) – Kulcsár (Zsolnai 67.), Oláh. Coach: Tibor Sisa.
Újpest FC: Balajcza – Tajthy, Takács, Simon (Banai 84.), Rajczi, Sitku, Kiss, Vermes, Privigyei (Bognár 78.), Egerszegi (Rubus 89.), Szokol. Coach: Géza Mészöly.
G.: Oláh (23.) – Simon (56.)
Y.: Lipusz (89.)
R.: Tajthy (45.)

BFC Siófok: Szalma – Tusori (Horváth 46.), Mogyorósi, Pécseli, Novák (Lukács 70.) – Tóth, Kecskés (Ludánszki 46.), Kocsis (Fehér 46.), Piller – Ivancsics (Délczeg 46.), Csermelyi. Coach: István Mihalecz.
Kaposvári Rákóczi FC: Milinte – Godslove, Grúz, Keresztes (Balázs 48.), Petrók (Zahorecz 53.) – Lelkes, Szepessy (Kulcsár 54.), Lipusz (Pavlovic 64.), O. Kovács – Bőle, Zsolnai (Peric 79.). Coach: Tibor Sisa.
G.: Ivancsics (36.) – Pavlovic (78.)
Y.: Ivancsics (19.) – Szepessy (33.), O. Kovács (55.), Zahorecz (67.), Kulcsár (91.)

Kaposvári Rákóczi FC: Strublics – Kovácsevics, Petrók, Zsók (Zahorecz 46.), Lelkes (Pavlovic 54.) – O. Kovács (Oláh 54.), Horváth – Bőle (Peric 60.), Scepanovic (Kulcsár 46.), Lipusz – Pavicevic. Coach: Tibor Sisa.
BFC Siófok: Szalma – Graszl (Fehér 50.), Ludánszki, Pécseli, Horváth – Piller, Kecskés (Ivancsics 72.), Kocsis, Tóth – Homma (Délczeg 72.), Thiago (Varga 90.). Coach: István Mihalecz.
G.: Thiago (12.), Homma (65.), Kecskés (67.)
Y.: Pavicevic (33.) – Graszl (33.)

References

External links
Eufo
DVSC
UEFA
fixtures and results

2010-11
Hungarian football clubs 2010–11 season